Rockwood is an unincorporated community in Coleman County, Texas, United States. Although unincorporated, it has a post office, with the ZIP code of 76873.

Rockwood is the closest town to the actual "Heart of Texas", geographically, whose coordinates are: +31° 29' 57.00", -99° 21' 5.00"

References

Unincorporated communities in Coleman County, Texas
Unincorporated communities in Texas